Berengar (died 1093), the third son of Wilfred II of Cerdanya and Guisla, was the count of Berga in 1050 from the death of his brother Bernard I until he renounced the county later the same year to become bishop of Girona until his death. The county passed to his eldest brother, Raymond I of Cerdanya.

11th-century Roman Catholic bishops in Spain
11th-century Visigothic people
11th-century Catalan people
1093 deaths
Year of birth unknown